The 2015–16 Serbian SuperLiga is the tenth season of the Serbian SuperLiga since its establishment. The season was started on 17 July 2015 and will be finished on 21 May 2016 with a matches of the last round of the play-offs. Partizan are the defending champions.

Changes from 2014–15

Structural changes
The competition has been split into two stages, regular season and playoffs.

Regular season

Each of the 16 competitors in the SuperLiga hosts every other team once in the regular season, for a total of 30 matches. A win earns three points and a draw earns one point. Teams are ranked by total points, then by total wins and finally by goal difference, number of scored goals, number of away goals and number of away wins. If teams are still level, a test-match is played in two legs to determine the final order in the standings. A playoff phase is then played from March to May.

Championship playoff

The point system in the championship playoff is the same as during the regular season, except that each team starts with half of the points they won in the regular season, rounded up to the nearest integer.

The top eight teams from the regular season enter the championship playoff, with the first-placed team winning the championship of Serbia. Each team plays their opponents once. In the case of a tie, the number of points won in the regular season will be used as a primary tie-breaker.

Relegation playoff

Teams ranked 9 to 16 after the regular season enter the relegation playoffs, with the last two placed teams will be relegated to the Serbian First League. Each team plays their opponents once.

Teams 

The league contains 16 teams: thirteen teams from the 2014–15 Serbian SuperLiga, two new teams from the 2014–15 Serbian First League and the winner of the play-offs between the 14th placed team from the 2014–15 SuperLiga and the third placed team from the 2014–15 First League. Radnik, the 2014–15 First League champion, joins the top level for the first time in its history. Runners-up Javor are back just one year after their relegation. Metalac won the play-off against Napredak Kruševac and returns to the top level after three years.

Stadiums and locations

Personnel and kits

Note: Flags indicate national team as has been defined under FIFA eligibility rules. Players and Managers may hold more than one non-FIFA nationality.

Select Sport is the official ball supplier for Serbian SuperLiga.

Transfers
 For the list of transfers involving SuperLiga clubs during 2014–15 season, please see: List of Serbian football transfers summer 2015 and List of Serbian football transfers winter 2015–16.

Regular season

League table

Results
Each of the 16 competitors in the SuperLiga hosts every other team once in the regular season, for a total of 30 matches.

Play-offs

Championship round
The top eight teams advance from the regular season. Points from the regular season are halved with half points rounded up. Teams play each other once.

League table

Results

Relegation round
The bottom eight teams from the regular season play in the relegation round. Points from the regular season are halved with half points rounded up. Teams play each other once.

League table

Results

Individual statistics

Top goalscorers
As of matches played on 22 May 2016.

Top assists
As of matches played on 3 May 2016.

Hat-tricks

5 Player scored five goals

Awards

Team of the Season

Player of the season 
 Hugo Vieira (Red Star Belgrade)

Head coach of the season
 Miodrag Božović (Red Star Belgrade)

References

External links
 Official website
 uefa.com
 soccerway.com

Serbia
1
Serbian SuperLiga seasons